Lithuania participated in the Eurovision Song Contest 2018 with the song "When We're Old" written by Vytautas Bikus. The song was performed by Ieva Zasimauskaitė. The Lithuanian broadcaster Lithuanian National Radio and Television (LRT) organised the national final "Eurovizijos" dainų konkurso nacionalinė atranka (Eurovision Song Contest national selection) in order to select the Lithuanian entry for the 2018 contest in Lisbon, Portugal. The national final took place over nine weeks and involved 50 competing entries. The results of each show were determined by the combination of votes from a jury panel and a public vote. In the final, six artists and songs remained and "When We're Old" performed by Ieva Zasimauskaitė was selected as the winner.

Lithuania was drawn to compete in the first semi-final of the Eurovision Song Contest which took place on 8 May 2018. Performing during the show in position 6, "When We're Old" was announced among the top 10 entries of the first semi-final and therefore qualified to compete in the final on 12 May. It was later revealed that Lithuania placed ninth out of the 19 participating countries in the semi-final with 119 points. In the final, Lithuania performed in position 4 and placed 12th out of the 26 participating countries, scoring 181 points.

Background

Prior to the 2018 contest, Lithuania had participated in the Eurovision Song Contest 18 times since its first entry in 1994. The nation's best placing in the contest was sixth, which it achieved in 2006 with the song "We Are the Winners" performed by LT United. In the 2017 contest, "Rain of Revolution" performed by Fusedmarc failed to qualify to the final.

For the 2018 contest, the Lithuanian national broadcaster, Lithuanian National Radio and Television (LRT), broadcast the event within Lithuania and organised the selection process for the nation's entry. Other than the internal selection of their debut entry in 1994, Lithuania has selected their entry consistently through a national final procedure. LRT confirmed their intentions to participate at the 2018 Eurovision Song Contest on 14 August 2017. On 17 October 2017, LRT announced the organization of "Eurovizijos" dainų konkurso nacionalinė atranka, which would be the national final to select Lithuania's entry for Lisbon.

Before Eurovision

"Eurovizijos" dainų konkurso nacionalinė atranka
"Eurovizijos" dainų konkurso nacionalinė atranka (Eurovision Song Contest national selection) was the national final format developed by LRT in order to select Lithuania's entry for the Eurovision Song Contest 2018. The competition involved a nine-week-long process that commenced on 6 January 2018 and concluded with a winning song and artist on 11 March 2018. The nine shows were hosted by Mantas Stonkus and Ugnė Skonsmanaitė and were broadcast on LRT televizija, LRT Lituanica and LRT Radijas as well as online via the broadcaster's website lrt.lt.

Format 
The 2018 competition involved 50 entries and consisted of nine shows. The first four shows consisted of 12 or 13 entries each and resulted in the elimination of 26 entries all together. The remaining 24 entries participated in the fifth and sixth shows consisting of 12 entries each. Six entries advanced from each show, while a public online repechage vote selected an additional two entries to advance among the 12 eliminated acts. The seventh and eighth show were the competition's semi-final where seven entries participated in each show and the top three proceeded to the final. In the final, the winner was selected from the remaining six entries.

The results of each of the nine shows were determined by the 50/50 combination of votes from a jury panel and public televoting. The ranking developed by both streams of voting was converted to points from 1-8, 10 and 12 and assigned based on the number of competing songs in the respective show. During the first eight shows, the jury panel consisted of four members, while the jury panel in the final consisted of seven members. The public could vote through telephone and SMS voting. Ties in all shows but the final were decided in favour of the entry that received the most points from the jury. In the final, a tie would be decided in favour of the entry that received the most votes from the public.

Competing entries
On 17 October 2017, LRT opened two separate submission forms: one for artists and another for songwriters to submit their songs. Artists that applied to compete with a song were required to indicate which song they wanted to compete with on their application. The submission deadline for both applications concluded on 1 December 2017. On 15 January 2018, LRT announced the 50 artists selected for the competition. Among the artists was previous Lithuanian Eurovision contestant Erica Jennings, who represented Lithuania in 2001 as part of Skamp. The final changes to the list of 50 competing acts were made with the addition of Silvija Pankūnaitė to the list of performers and the replacement of Monika Marija for the withdrawal of Erica Jennings.

Shows

Elimination shows 
The six elimination shows of the competition aired from the LRT studios in Vilnius between 6 January and 17 February 2018. The first four shows featured the 50 competing entries, while the fifth and sixth show each featured 12 of the 24 remaining entries in the competition. The members of the jury consisted of Ramūnas Zilnys (music reviewer; all shows), Darius Užkuraitis (LRT Opus director; first, second and fifth shows), Dovilė Filmanavičiūtė (singer-songwriter; first and fifth show), Aistė Pilvelytė (singer; first show), Vaidas Baumila (singer; second and sixth show), Aleksandras Pogrebnojus (fashion designer; second show), Gerūta Griniūtė (cultural presenter and event host; second show), Beata Nicholson (presenter and journalist; third show), Viktoras Diawara (singer and producer; third show), Giedrė Kilčiauskienė (singer; third show), Leon Somov (producer and composer; fourth show), Arnoldas Lukošius (keyboardist; fourth show), Vytautas Rumšas (actor; fourth show), Tomas Sinickis (musician and singer-songwriter; fifth show), Vaidas Stackevičius (producer; sixth show) and Monika Linkytė (singer-songwriter; sixth show). The top six entries advanced from each show, while the bottom entries were eliminated.

Online repechage 
The bottom six entries of the fifth and sixth elimination shows were voted upon by the public through LRT's internet voting platform between 19 and 21 February 2018. The top two entries with the most votes advanced to the semi-finals.

Semi-finals 
The two semi-finals of the competition took place at the LRT studios in Vilnius on 24 February and 3 March 2018 and featured seven competing entries each. The semi-finals were broadcast live; all other preceding shows were pre-recorded earlier in the week before their airdates. The members of the jury consisted of Ramūnas Zilnys (music reviewer; first and second semi-final), Dalia Ibelhauptaitė (director and playwright; first and second semi-final), Tomas Sinickis (musician and singer-songwriter; first semi-final), Giedrė Kilčiauskienė (singer; first semi-final), Arnoldas Lukošius (keyboardist; second semi-final) and Darius Užkuraitis (LRT Opus director; second semi-final). The top three entries advanced to the final from each semi-final, while the bottom four were eliminated.

Final 
The final of the competition took place on 11 March 2018 at the Žalgirio Arena in Kaunas and featured the remaining six entries that qualified from the semi-finals. The members of the jury consisted of Ramūnas Zilnys (music reviewer), Dalia Ibelhauptaitė (director and playwright), Sasha Song (singer-songwriter), Vytautas Rumšas (actor), Leon Somov (producer and composer), Dovilė Filmanavičiūtė (singer-songwriter) and Milda Adomaitienė (music teacher). "When We're Old" performed by Ieva Zasimauskaitė was selected as the winner after gaining the most points following the combination of the jury vote and the public vote. In addition to the performances of the competing entries, the show was opened with 2001 Lithuanian Eurovision entrant Skamp performing the song "Laisvė", Raminta Naujalytė-Bjelle performing the song "Baltas paukštis", Fusedmarc performing the 2017 Lithuanian Eurovision entry "Rain of Revolution" and Ari Ólafsson performing the 2018 Icelandic Eurovision entry "Our Choice", while the interval acts included Original Copy, Thundertale, juror Sasha Song, Moniqué performing the song "Nenoriu grįžt namo" and Saara Aalto performing a modified version of the 2018 Finnish Eurovision entry "Monsters" which contained one verse in Lithuanian.

Promotion 
Ieva Zasimauskaitė made several appearances across Europe to specifically promote "When We're Old" as the Lithuanian Eurovision entry. On 24 March, Zasimauskaitė performed during the Eurovision PreParty Riga, which was organised by OGAE Latvia and held at the Crystal Club Concert Hall in Riga, Latvia. Between 8 and 11 April, Zasimauskaitė took part in promotional activities in Tel Aviv, Israel and performed during the Israel Calling event held at the Rabin Square. On 17 April, Zasimauskaitė performed during the London Eurovision Party, which was held at the Café de Paris venue in London, United Kingdom and hosted by Nicki French and Paddy O'Connell.

At Eurovision
According to Eurovision rules, all nations with the exceptions of the host country and the "Big Five" (France, Germany, Italy, Spain and the United Kingdom) are required to qualify from one of two semi-finals in order to compete for the final; the top 10 countries from each semi-final progress to the final. The European Broadcasting Union (EBU) split up the competing countries into six different pots based on voting patterns from previous contests, with countries with favourable voting histories put into the same pot. On 29 January 2018, an allocation draw was held which placed each country into one of the two semi-finals, as well as which half of the show they would perform in. Lithuania was placed into the first semi-final, to be held on 8 May 2018, and was scheduled to perform in the first half of the show.

Once all the competing songs for the 2018 contest had been released, the running order for the semi-finals was decided by the shows' producers rather than through another draw, so that similar songs were not placed next to each other. Lithuania was set to perform in position 6, following the entry from the Czech Republic and before the entry from Israel.

The two semi-finals and final were broadcast in Lithuania on LRT and LRT Radijas with commentary by Darius Užkuraitis and Gerūta Griniūtė. The Lithuanian spokesperson, who announced the top 12-point score awarded by the Lithuanian jury during the final, was Eglė Daugėlaitė.

Semi-final

Ieva Zasimauskaitė took part in technical rehearsals on 29 April and 3 May, followed by dress rehearsals on 7 and 8 May. This included the jury show on 7 May where the professional juries of each country watched and voted on the competing entries.

The Lithuanian performance featured Ieva Zasimauskaitė performing on stage in a pastel pink costume. The performance began with Zasimauskaitė sitting at the centre of the stage with a spotlight being displayed, and featured yellow lighting at the first chorus. The performance also featured black-and-white holograms of people walking, dancing and showing love for each other. For the final chorus, Zasimauskaitė moved onto the stage bridge and was met at the end by her husband Marius Kiltinavičius. The stage director for the Lithuanian performance was Povilas Varvuolis. Ieva Zasimauskaitė was also joined by an off-stage backing vocalist: Akmėja Bru.

At the end of the show, Lithuania was announced as having finished in the top 10 and subsequently qualifying for the final. It was later revealed that Lithuania placed ninth in the semi-final, receiving a total of 119 points: 62 points from the televoting and 57 points from the juries.

Final 
Shortly after the first semi-final, a winners' press conference was held for the 10 qualifying countries. As part of this press conference, the qualifying artists took part in a draw to determine which half of the final they would subsequently participate in. This draw was done in the order the countries were announced during the semi-final. Lithuania was drawn to compete in the first half. Following this draw, the shows' producers decided upon the running order of the final, as they had done for the semi-finals. Lithuania was subsequently placed to perform in position 4, following the entry from Slovenia and before the entry from Austria.

Ieva Zasimauskaitė once again took part in dress rehearsals on 11 and 12 May before the final, including the jury final where the professional juries cast their final votes before the live show. Lithuania placed 12th in the final, scoring 181 points: 91 points from the televoting and 90 points from the juries.

Voting
Voting during the three shows involved each country awarding two sets of points from 1–8, 10 and 12: one from their professional jury and the other from televoting. Each nation's jury consisted of five music industry professionals who are citizens of the country they represent, with their names published before the contest to ensure transparency. This jury judged each entry based on: vocal capacity; the stage performance; the song's composition and originality; and the overall impression by the act. In addition, no member of a national jury was permitted to be related in any way to any of the competing acts in such a way that they cannot vote impartially and independently. The individual rankings of each jury member as well as the nation's televoting results were released shortly after the final.

Below is a breakdown of points awarded to Lithuania and awarded by Lithuania in the first semi-final and grand final of the contest, and the breakdown of the jury voting and televoting conducted during the two shows:

Points awarded to Lithuania

Points awarded by Lithuania

Detailed voting results
The following members comprised the Lithuanian jury:
 Lauras Lučiūnas (jury chairperson)music producer
 Jurga Šeduikytė Bareikienė (Jurga)singer, actress, journalist
 Dovilė Filmanavičiūtė (Miss Sheep)singer, journalist
 Mindaugas Urbaitiscomposer, professor
 Leonas Somovas (Leon Somov)composer, singer, music producer

References

External links

2018
Countries in the Eurovision Song Contest 2018
Eurovision